Marianne Schroeder (born 1949 in Reiden) is a Swiss pianist and composer. She studied with Giacinto Scelsi. She played at Carnegie Hall, Lucerne Festival and Théâtre des Champs-Élysées. She worked with John Cage and Shigeru Kan-no.

She is a member of the Groupe Lacroix and as such is specialized in contemporary classical music. As a member of the Groupe Lacroix she has worked with international musicians, such as the Ensemble Sortisatio.

Discography 

Braxton & Stockhausen (hatART, 1984), with Garrett List, works by Anthony Braxton and Karlheinz Stockhausen (Klavierstücke VI–VIII)
Petra (Blank Forms Editions, 2019), with Stefan Tcherepnin, live recording of Petra, for two pianos (1991) by Maryanne Amacher
With the Groupe Lacroix
1997: The Composer Group together with the Moscow Rachmaninov Trio (Creative Works Records)
2003: 8 Pieces on Paul Klee together with the Ensemble Sortisatio (Creative Works Records)
With Anthony Braxton
Four Compositions (Solo, Duo & Trio) 1982/1988 (hatART, 1989)

References

External links 
 "Recital: Marianne Schroeder, Pianist" by Allan Kozinn, The New York Times, 1 March 1988

Swiss classical pianists
Swiss women pianists
1949 births
Living people
People from Willisau District
21st-century classical pianists
Women classical pianists
21st-century women pianists